The Belcher's is a private residential estate in Shek Tong Tsui, Hong Kong Island. It consists of six residential buildings constructed in two phases; three buildings were constructed in each phase. Construction for the first phase was completed in 2000, and in 2001 for the second phase. The estate was named after the adjacent Belcher's Street, which in turned was named after Sir Edward Belcher, a Canadian-born British naval officer and explorer.

The Belcher's is connected to the Westwood mall.

Features
Towers 5 and 6 have 63 floors. Towers 1 and 2 have 61 floors. Towers 3 and 8 have 59 floors. The development's facilities include, amongst other things, carparks, swimming pools, and a shopping mall, The Westwood.

It is located at 89 Pok Fu Lam Road and close to a number of schools and the University of Hong Kong. The Belcher's links to a transportation network including the HKU station on the Island line.

Demographics
In the 2016 by-census, the population of the estate was recorded as 6,908. The median age of the residents was 39.2.

See also
 Belcher (constituency), Central and Western District Council constituency based on the area
 List of tallest buildings in Hong Kong
 HKU station a station of the MTR, serving The Belcher's

References

External links

 The Belcher's official website
 Capt. Belcher's map of Hong Hong

Shek Tong Tsui
Sun Hung Kai Properties
Residential buildings completed in 2001
Residential skyscrapers in Hong Kong